Metofluthrin is a pyrethroid used as an insect repellent.   The vapors of metofluthrin are highly effective and capable of repelling up to 97% of mosquitoes in field tests.  Metofluthrin is used in a variety of consumer products, called emanators, for indoor and outdoor use.  These products produce a vapor that protects an individual or area. Effectiveness is reduced by air movement. Metofluthrin is neurotoxic, and is not meant to be applied directly to human skin. 

Although metofluthrin has insecticidal properties against the sand fly, Phlebotomus sergenti, it is not an effective repellent of this insect.

See also
 Phlebotomus, a genus of sand flies
 Mosquito coil, may contain metofluthrin
 Off! (brand), some products contain metofluthrin

References

External links
 

(2,3,5,6-tetrafluorophenyl)methyl 3-ethenyl-2,2-dimethylcyclopropane-1-carboxylates
Insect repellents